Coleophora elephantella is a moth of the family Coleophoridae. It is found in Turkestan and Uzbekistan.

The larvae feed on Caroxylon species, including Caroxylon orientalis. They form large galls on the branches of their host plant. These have the form of a thickening on the branches with a broad cavity inside. The larvae are stout, light yellow and have a chocolate-brown head.

References

elephantella
Moths described in 1970
Moths of Asia